Barby may refer to:

 Barby, Ardennes, a village in Grand Est, France
 Barby, Germany, a town in Saxony-Anhalt
 Barby, Northamptonshire, a village in England
 Barby, Savoie, a village in Auvergne-Rhône-Alpes, France
 Bärby, a locality in Uppsala County, Sweden

See also
 Barbey (disambiguation)
 Barbee (disambiguation)
 Barbie (disambiguation)
 Barbi (disambiguation)
 Barbe (disambiguation)